Every Weekend is the third studio album by British electronic band Hadouken!.  The album was initially set for release on 18 February 2013, but was released on 18 March 2013 via Surface Noise Records.

Track listing

Notes
 Track listing and credits from album booklet.
  signifies a co-producer
  signifies an additional producer
"Bad Signal" features uncredited vocals from Yolanda Quartey.

Sample credits
 "Bad Signal" contains interpolations of "You Keep Me Hangin' On", written and performed by Holland–Dozier–Holland.

Personnel
Hadouken!
 James Smith
 Alice Spooner
 Daniel Rice
 Christopher Purcell
 Nick Rice

Technical personnel
 Aeph – production
 Blame - additional production
 Drumsound & Bassline Smith – production
 Greg "Wizard" Fleming - vocal mixing
 Henry "Hal" Ritson - additional recording
 James K. Stanford - additional recording
 Joel Pott - writer
 Kev Willow - additional production
 Loadstar – production
 Nightwatch – production
 Sarah Decourcy - vocal production and recording
 Stuart Hawkes - mastering
 Wez Clarke - mixing
 Yolanda Quartey - backing vocals

References

Hadouken! albums
2013 albums